Jinny Blom (born circa 1961) is a British landscape architect, and garden designer. She has presented at the Chelsea Flower Show. and in 2007, she won a gold medal

She studied psychology at University.]. She is Artist in Residence for the Chelsea and Westminster Hospital. She was named a best garden designer and landscaper in Britain. She was named one of the 100 leading women in UK horticulture.

Works

References

External links 

 Q&A: Famed British Landscape Gardener Jinny Blom – Janet Mavec

Living people
Year of birth missing (living people)
British landscape architects
Women landscape architects